Baudelaire is a French surname. Notable people with the surname include:

Charles Baudelaire, a French macabre poet
Caroline Aupick (formerly Baudelaire), Charles Baudelaire's disparaging mother
Éric Baudelaire, a Franco-American artist and filmmaker
The Baudelaire family within A Series of Unfortunate Events:
Violet Baudelaire, the eldest of the three Baudelaire orphans
Klaus Baudelaire, the second eldest of the Baudelaire orphans
Sunny Baudelaire, the youngest of the three Baudelaire orphans
Bertrand Baudelaire, the children's father
Beatrice Baudelaire, the author's unrequited love interest and the children's mother
Tyler Baudelaire, a fictional alter ego of musician Tyler, the Creator as featured on his album Call Me If You Get Lost

See also
Baudelaire (disambiguation)

French-language surnames